Device 6 (stylized as DEVICE 6) is a text-based adventure game developed by Swedish game developer Simogo for iOS. The game uses text, images and sounds to guide the player through a set of puzzles, which the in-game protagonist, Anna, needs to solve to escape from an unknown island.

Gameplay 
Device 6 uses mainly text in its gameplay, and the player swipes the screen to move through or review the story. The text may turn or split into branches in certain points of the game, adapting to the protagonist's movements in the story. The player uses buttons to interact with in-game elements shown in black-and-white pictures like machines to get hints or to solve a puzzle.

Plot 
The game begins with Anna, the protagonist, waking up in an unknown castle, only with an unpleasant doll in her memory. Throughout her journey, she meets strange people and creatures appearing to be unresponsive or electronically controlled, raising her suspicion.

Reception 

Device 6 has received highly positive reviews from critics. The game is listed with a score of 92/100, indicating "universal acclaim" on review aggregation site Metacritic. Critics applaud the game for its creative way of storytelling, the well-written prose and the audio effects, while noting its short gameplay.

The game won the Excellence in Audio award in the 2014 Independent Games Festival, Apple Design Awards 2014, 2014 Best App Ever Award from Pocket Gamer and several others. It was also nominated for several BAFTA Games Awards.

As of March 2014, the game has sold 200,000 copies on App Store, according to the developer.

Soundtrack 
Music in Device 6 is composed by Daniel Olsén. The soundtrack album of the game, DEVICE 6 Original Soundtrack, was released on 1 November 2013. The singer of the lead single in the album, Jonathan Eng, also makes an appearance in-game.

References

External links 
 

2013 video games
2010s interactive fiction
IOS games
IOS-only games
Simogo games
Video games developed in Sweden
Video games featuring female protagonists
Single-player video games
Apple Design Awards recipients
Independent Games Festival winners